The magistrate of Lienchiang is the chief executive of the government of Lienchiang County, Fujian Province, Republic of China. This list includes directly elected magistrates of the county. The incumbent Magistrate is Wang Chung-ming of the Kuomintang since 25 December 2022.

Directly elected County Magistrates

Timeline

See also
 List of heads of local governments in the Republic of China

References

External links 

 Lienchiang County Government

 
Lienchiang